Metrosideros umbellata, the southern rātā, is a tree endemic to New Zealand. It produces masses of red flowers in summer. Unlike its relative, northern rātā, this species rarely grows as an epiphyte.

Description
White or yellow flowers are also known. Flowering usually occurs between December and February, but this depends on local conditions. The wood is hard, dense, and very strong. The bark is rough and flaky and provides an ideal stratum for the roots of epiphytic plants such as Astelia species and Freycinetia banksii (Kiekie). Southern rātā is a major source of honey on the West Coast of the South Island. Kaka, tui, and bellbirds visit rātā to take advantage of the abundant nectar.

Distribution 
It prefers cooler regions with high rainfall and is particularly common along the west coast of the South Island where its nectar is the main source of a locally produced rātā honey. Southern rātā is the most widespread of the New Zealand tree rātā species. It is locally present in the North Island from latitude 36° southwards, is more common in western parts of the South Island but absent from much of the east, and is common on Stewart Island (47°S) and in the Auckland Islands, where it reaches its southern limit at just over 50°S.

Conservation 
Although southern rātā is not regarded as threatened, it is rather uncommon in the North Island, and in certain areas it is threatened by possum browse. In the Tararua range, southern rātā populations appear to have been replaced by a population consisting of hybrids between northern and southern rātā.

Project Crimson is a charitable trust that promotes conservation of rātā as well as the related pōhutukawa.

Cultivation 
Southern rātā is a beautiful specimen tree, but growth can be slow unless it is grown in ideal conditions with moist soil. It is easily grown from fresh seed. While it is possible to grow the tree from softwood or semi-hardwood cuttings, these often prove reluctant to strike roots. It is ideal for coastal environments because it has a good resistance to wind and salt.

At least 16 cultivars of southern rātā have been released. There are also known cultivars of hybrids between southern rātā and pōhutukawa, and between northern rātā and southern rātā. Known cultivars include:

∞ Hybrid of southern rātā and northern rātā
¤ Hybrid of southern rātā and pōhutukawa

See also
Metrosideros excelsa, pōhutukawa
Metrosideros robusta, northern rātā
Metrosideros bartlettii, Bartlett's rātā
Metrosideros parkinsonii, Parkinson's rātā

References

Further reading
Salmon, J.T., 1986. The Native Trees of New Zealand. Wellington: Heinneman Reed.
Simpson, P., 2005. Pōhutukawa & Rātā: New Zealand's Iron-Hearted Trees. Wellington: Te Papa Press.

External links

 Project Crimson

umbellata
Endemic flora of New Zealand
Flora of the Auckland Islands
Trees of New Zealand
Trees of mild maritime climate
Garden plants of New Zealand
Ornamental trees
Taxa named by Antonio José Cavanilles